Manulea replana, the lichen-eating caterpillar or lichen moth, is a species of moth of the subfamily Arctiinae. It is found in Australia (including New South Wales, Queensland and Tasmania).

The wingspan is about 30 mm. Adults are brown with a yellow line along the edge of the forewing and yellow hindwings with a black margin.

Like the common name suggest, the larvae feed on lichen. They are brown, except for a black and white patch at each end and in the middle and can reach a length of about 30 mm. Their body is covered in hairs which can cause urticaria. Pupation takes place within a cocoon in a sheltered crevice.

References

Moths described in 1805
Lithosiina